They'll Come Back is a 2012 Brazilian drama film directed by Marcelo Lordello. Lordello's directorial debut, it received the award for best film at the 45th Festival de Brasília do Cinema Brasileiro.

Plot
Cris (Maria Luíza Tavares) and Peu (Georgio Kokkosi), her older brother, are left on the side of a road by their own parents. The brothers were punished for fighting constantly during a trip to the beach. After a few hours, realizing that their parents will not return, Peu part in search of a gas station. Cris remains in place for a whole day and, without news of her parents or brother, decides to go by herself the way back home.

Cast
Maria Luiza Tavares as Cris
Geórgio Kokkosi as Peu
Elayne de Moura as Elayne
Mauricéia Conceição as Fátima
Jéssica Gomes de Brito as Jennifer
Irma Brown as Pri
Germano Haiut as Grandfather
Teresa Costa Rêgo as Grandma
Clara Oliveira as Geórgia

References

External links
 

2012 drama films
2012 films
Brazilian drama films
Films shot in Recife
2012 directorial debut films